Kenyacus is a genus of beetles in the family Carabidae first described by Charles Alluaud in 1917.

Species 
Kenyacus contains the following twenty-four species:

 Kenyacus acrobius Alluaud, 1917
 Kenyacus angustatus Kataev, 2019
 Kenyacus baleensis Clarke, 1973
 Kenyacus berndi Kataev, 2019
 Kenyacus elgonensis Basilewsky, 1948
 Kenyacus elveni Kataev, 2020
 Kenyacus gusarovi Kataev, 2019
 Kenyacus hypsibius Alluaud, 1917
 Kenyacus jeanneli Basilewsky, 1948
 Kenyacus kinangopinus Basilewsky, 1948
 Kenyacus leleupi Basilewsky, 1951
 Kenyacus meruanus Basilewsky, 1962
 Kenyacus minor Basilewsky, 1951
 Kenyacus nyakasibanus Basilewsky, 1951
 Kenyacus oldeanicus Basilewsky, 1962
 Kenyacus parvus Kataev, 2019
 Kenyacus pusillus Kataev, 2019
 Kenyacus ruwenzoricus Basilewsky, 1955
 Kenyacus ruwenzorii (Alluaud, 1917)
 Kenyacus scotti Basilewsky, 1948
 Kenyacus similis Kataev, 2019
 Kenyacus subcaecus Basilewsky, 1956
 Kenyacus trechoides Kataev, 2019
 Kenyacus uluguruanus Basilewsky, 1976

References

Harpalinae